All Star Wrestling (ASW), also known as Super Slam Wrestling (SSW), is a British professional wrestling promotion operated by Brian Dixon and based in Birkenhead, England. Founded as Wrestling Enterprises of Birkenhead in October 1970, it has also been known over the years as All Star Promotions and Big Time Wrestling. ASW tours theatres, leisure centres, town halls, holiday camps, and similar venues, many of which are the same locations that were used for televised wrestling in the UK from the 1950s to the 1980s.

ASW is the oldest active wrestling promotion in the UK and the longest-running British promotion in history, a record it has held since September 2013 when it eclipsed the 42 years and 11 months tenure of Joint Promotions (1952–1995). It is also the third oldest professional wrestling promotion still in existence in the world, after the Mexican CMLL (founded 1933) and the American WWE (founded 1963).

ASW contributed to the final two years of ITV's regular televised wrestling programme in the UK in (1987 and 1988) and some ASW matches were included on VHS and DVD compilations and repeated as part of the World of Sport programming on The Fight Network until it stopped transmission in 2008. They were then repeated on the now defunct Men & Movies channel.

In July 2022, Dixon bequeathed all road management duties to his grandson Joseph Allmark, while continuing to lead the company in a purely office based capacity.

History

1970s
Brian Dixon, a referee and former head of the Jim Breaks Fan Club, established Wrestling Enterprises in Birkenhead during October 1970 initially as a vehicle for his girlfriend (and later wife) Mitzi Mueller, who was the British Ladies' Champion but had difficulty getting bookings from Joint Promotions. One of the company's earliest claims to fame was rebranding the wrestler Martin Ruane, formerly known as Luke McMasters, as new character Giant Haystacks. Originally called "Haystacks Calhoun", he was patterned after the similar American wrestler of the same name, about whom Dixon had read in imported American wrestling magazines. Haystacks would go on to achieve household fame in the UK after he moved to Joint Promotions in 1975 as the tag team partner - and later the archenemy - of Big Daddy.

During the late 1970s, Wrestling Enterprises held regular major shows at the Liverpool Stadium and organised a version of the World Middleweight Title after the previous version became extinct with the collapse of the Spanish wrestling scene c. 1975.  This title continued until champion Adrian Street emigrated to America in 1981.  Wrestling Enterprises also collaborated heavily with another independent promoter, former middleweight star Jackie Pallo.  Neither promoter was able to gain a slice of ITV coverage however, as the 1981 contract renewal negotiations resulted in a five-year extension on Joint Promotions' exclusive monopoly of ITV wrestling.

1980s
By the early 1980s there was increasing dissatisfaction among both fans and wrestlers with the direction of Joint Promotions (which was increasingly centred on Big Daddy), which resulted in a steady flow of top UK talent into All Star Wrestling (as it was by then renamed) and away from Joint and the TV spotlight.  Title-holders such as World Heavyweight Champion Mighty John Quinn, rival claimant Wayne Bridges, British Heavyweight Champion Tony St Clair, World Heavy-Middleweight Champion Mark Rocco, British Heavy-Middleweight Champion Frank 'Chic' Cullen and World Lightweight Champion Johnny Saint all defected to All Star taking their titles with them, as did many non-titleholders. By the mid-1980s All Star was running shows head-to-head with Joint Promotions and had its own TV show on satellite channel Screensport.

When Joint's five-year extension on its monopoly of ITV wrestling expired at the end of 1986, All Star, along with the WWF, was also given a share of the televised wrestling shows for the two years 1987-88.  The beginning of this period coincided with the return to full-time action for legendary masked wrestler Kendo Nagasaki under the All Star banner.  At the end of 1988, Greg Dyke cancelled wrestling on ITV after 33 years.  Whereas Joint dwindled downwards as a touring vehicle for Big Daddy (and later Davey Boy Smith) before finally folding in 1995, All Star had played its cards well with regard to its two years of TV exposure, using the time in particular to build up the returning Nagasaki as its lead heel and establishing such storylines as his tag team-cum-feud with Rollerball Rocco and his "hypnotism" of Robbie Brookside.

1990s
The end of TV coverage left many of these storylines at a cliffhanger and consequently All Star underwent a box office boom as hardcore fans turned up to live shows to see what happened next, and kept coming for several years due to careful use of show-to-show storylines.  Headline matches frequently pitted Nagasaki in violent heel vs heel battles against the likes of Rocco, Dave 'Fit' Finlay, Skull Murphy and even Giant Haystacks or at smaller venues teaming with regular partner "Blondie" Bob Barrett to usually defeat blue-eye opposition.
 
All Star's post-television boom wore off after 1993 when Nagasaki retired for a second time.  However, the promotion kept afloat on live shows at certain established venues and particularly on the holiday camp circuit.  Since the mid-1990s, the promotion has mainly been focussed on family entertainment.  After the demise of Joint/RWS, All Star's chief rival on the live circuit was Scott Conway's TWA (The Wrestling Alliance) promotion, founded as the Southeastern Wrestling Alliance in 1989.  By the late 1990s, many smaller British promoters were increasingly abandoning their British identity in favour of "WWF Tribute" shows, with British performers crudely imitating World Wrestling Federation stars.

21st century
Although All Star never descended into a full-fledged 'tribute show', by the turn of the millennium, many of these tribute acts such as the "UK Undertaker" and "Big Red Machine" were nonetheless headlining All Star shows.  Disaffected with this and other matters (such as the inclusion of former WWF World Champion Yokozuna on advertising posters over a year after he had died, the continued advertising of Davey Boy Smith months after his planned tour fell through and the use of a photo of the original WWF Kane to depict the tribute performer "Big Red Machine"), Conway cut his links with All Star and declared a promotional war.  He began to promote his TWA as an alternative, featuring more serious wrestling (in much the same way as All Star had previously targeted Joint fans disaffected with Big Daddy).  All Star duly adapted to meet the challenge, recruiting a new generation of wrestlers such as Dean Allmark and Robbie Dynamite and signing up such stars as "American Dragon" Bryan Danielson.  The promotional war came to an abrupt end in 2003 when Conway relocated to Thailand, closing down the TWA (which he briefly tried to transplant to his new country as the "Thai Wrestling Alliance").

As the 2000s wore on, All Star reached new heights of activity not seen since the post-television boom of the early 1990s, reactivating many more old TV venues, and in the summer 2008 season revived the old tradition of wrestling shows at Blackpool Tower, with a Friday night residency there.  All Star  re-established old links with promoters in France, Germany, Japan and Calgary. All Star wrestlers have been widely used to represent Britain by major American promoters, for example the Team UK in TNA's 2004 X Cup which featured four All Star Wrestling regulars James Mason, Dean Allmark, Robbie Dynamite and Frankie Sloan.  Mason would also guest on WWE Smackdown in 2008, defeating MVP.

In April 2014, ASW established a relationship with Japanese promotion Wrestle-1.

The promotion runs a school in Birkenhead, with Allmark and Dynamite as chief trainers. Dixon's daughter Laetitia is a popular ring announcer for the promotion and is married to Allmark. In July 2022 the company announced that their elder son, referee Joseph Allmark, would be taking over day-to-day operations on the road, while the elder Dixon would move to a back seat role from the company's Birkenhead office.

Championships

Current champions

Former championships

Mountevans Committee-established titles
The Mountevans committee was an independent committee which met in 1947 to establish a set of rules and championships for the British professional wrestling scene. Four of the six current titles listed above were set up by the committee. All Star Wrestling hosted many other such championships in the past, some of which have since been moved to or revived by other promotions.

Other (non-Mountevans) titles formerly in All Star
(The below list of various championships previously featured on All Star shows but not recognised under the UK's Mountevans Committee rules include company-only championships as well as titles from American promotions defended by visiting champions. As with the previous list, some of these remained active outside of All Star)

TNA World Tag Team Title
Defended on All Star shows by then-champions Doug Williams and Nick Aldis while on a UK homecoming tour in October 2009.  Title still active, mostly in its promotion of origin.

WCW TV Title
Brought to All Star briefly by Lord Steven Regal while on a World Tour in 1996, returned to home promotion subsequently.  Abandoned by WCW in 2000.

Pan Pacific World Heavyweight title
Claimed on All Star shows by Joe E Legend c. 2005-2007.

All Star Peoples Championship
Title originally created by All Star in 2004.  Abandoned in 2005.

References

External links
http://superslamwrestling.co.uk

British professional wrestling promotions
1970 establishments in the United Kingdom